Santa Olalla del Cala is a large village within the Autonomous region of Andalucia in southern Spain.

Location
The village is situated in the southern slopes of the foothills of the Sierra Morena mountain range close to the border between the regions of Andalusia and Extremadura. The municipality is in the northeast of the Province of Huelva, and is within the Aracena Natural Park, which is a protected areas of the Community and occupies the entire north of the province. The village sits on the eastern slope of a proment hill which is topped with a castle fortress, a parish church which in the past has been a Jewish synagogue and a Moorish Mosque. The surrounding countryside consists of meadows and small hills covered predominantly forest of oaks, chestnut trees and scrubland, through which numerous small streams flow, forming a landscape of outstanding natural beauty.

Local Economy
The local economic activity of the municipality is in agriculture especially Olive groves and Holm Oak foraging groves. The village is also renowned for its cork and wood crafting works as well as embroidery and crochet needle
Crafts. Other working activities in the village also include wholesale and retail trading, houses building, activities related to the sale and repair of private and agricultural vehicles and motorbikes. The local gastronomy incorporates a large range of tasty products derived from the Iberian pig. Santa Olalla’s famous sausages are the best elements of its gastronomy.

The Castle

The castle stands on a prominent rocky ridge above the village. The fortress, although the ramparts are reminiscent of Moorish castles, was built by the Christian king of Castile, Sancho IV in the thirteenth century replacing a much smaller fortress which had been built earlier by the Muslim rulers of Andalucía. The Muslim structure is thought to have been built on top a much early Roman fortification. The castle was part of a defence system built to protect the city of Seville from the Portuguese. This defence system was called the Banda Gallega or The Galician Band. The system composed of three lines of defence, which mostly utilized older Moorish fortresses. The first line contained the castles of Aroche, Encinasola and Fregenal de la Sierra. In the second line was the Torre of San Bartolomé and Cortegana castle. The third line included Santa Olalla del Cala and the fortress at Aracena.

Construction

The castle is constructed from stone masonry and brickwork. The curtain walls have ten towers in total. Four of the towers are circular and the other six are rectangular in shape. The towers are constructed of solid stone and rise to the height of the parapet at which there is a vaulted chamber. This is topped by battlements of which some have pyramidal and brick cube castellation. The inner precinct is of an irregular coffin shape and follows the plan of the ridge top of the hill. On the North West elevation there is an entrance tower which is turned 90° to the main curtain wall of the fortress.

Later Years

Following the castle’s decline as a fortress other uses were found for the stronghold. In the 19th century and into the 20th century the castle precinct and curtain walls were used as the municipal cemetery. The walls were pierced to form burial niches. This had a detrimental effect on the castle, considerably weakening the structure. In 1949 the castle was declared a site of cultural interest and measures were taken to preserve the site.

Iglesia de Nuestra Senora de la Asuncion

The church of Nuestra Senora de la Asuncion stands at the southern end of the rocky hill were the castle is situated. The church you see today has had different uses in since it was first built in the 9th century. In the 10th century it was a synagogue and was the Jewish quarter of the village. Two columns from that period can be seen inside the church. During the period of Muslim occupation the building became a mosque. The Apse still retains it Mudejar style with its brick arches and vaults. Two noted features of the Christian church include a fine example of a Gothic doorway, and a statue of the Virgin de los Dolores carved by the Spanish Baroque sculptor Juan de Mesa y Velasco of Seville. Unusually, there is also a preserved ship's anchor, kept here to commemorate the time when Santa Olalla was the base to a Maritime infantry regiment during the Napoleonic wars.

Pilgrimage Cross

Opposite the doorway to the Iglesia de Nuestra Senora de la Asuncion, and a little down the hill, stands a 16th-century Plateresco style cross erected to mark the way of Pilgrimage known as the 'Silver Way'
or Vía de la Plata to Santiago de Compostela from the Andulucian city of Seville. The marker consists of a baluster column topped by a Genovese capital. Above the capital sits a Plateresque flint cross.

Demographics

External links
 Statistics about Santa Olalla del Cala

Gallery

References

Municipalities in the Province of Huelva